In Greek mythology, Tremilus (Ancient Greek: Τρεμίλου or Τρέμιλος Tremilos) or Tremiles (Τρεμίλης) was the eponym of Tremile which was afterwards called Lycia. He was married to the nymph Praxidice, daughter of Ogygus, on silver Sibros  beside the whirling river. The couple had four sons: Tloos, Xanthus, Pinarus and Cragus.

Mythology 
When Tremiles died, Bellerophontes renamed the Tremileis Lycians. Hekataios calls them Tremilas in the 4th book of his Genealogies.

Note

Reference 

 Stephanus of Byzantium, Stephani Byzantii Ethnicorum quae supersunt, edited by August Meineike (1790-1870), published 1849. A few entries from this important ancient handbook of place names have been translated by Brady Kiesling. Online version at the Topos Text Project.

Lycians
Kings in Greek mythology
Lycia